Pauliku is a village in Jõhvi Parish, Ida-Viru County in northeastern Estonia. It is located just southwest of the town of Jõhvi and northwest of Ahtme, district of Kohtla-Järve. Pauliku is bordered by the Tallinn–Narva railway to the north and Tammiku spoil tip to the south. As of 2011 Census, the settlement's population was 70.

References

Villages in Ida-Viru County